Hypomecis is a genus of moths in the family Geometridae first described by Jacob Hübner in 1821.

Description
Palpi oblique, reaching beyond the frons and fringed with hair below. Forewings with slightly crenulate (scalloped) cilia. Vein 3 from near angle of cell and veins 7 to 9 from near upper angle. Typically with vein 10 and 11 arise from cell. Hindwings with vein 3 from near angle of cell. Cilia crenulate.

Ecology
Most of them are patterned cryptically and when they sit on bark, the markings appear like patches of lichen. Studies have shown that they choose the site for resting with care so that the pattern of crypsis is enhanced.

Selected species
Species include:
 Hypomecis adamata (Felder, 1874)
 Hypomecis brevifasciata (Wileman, 1911)
 Hypomecis buchholzaria (Lemmer, 1937)
 Hypomecis ceylanicaria Nietner, 1861
 Hypomecis cineracea (Moore, 1888)
 Hypomecis corticea (Bastelberger, 1911)
 Hypomecis driophila Goldfinch, 1944
 Hypomecis formosana (Wileman, 1912)
 Hypomecis gnopharia (Guenée in Boisduval & Guenée, 1858)
 Hypomecis intectaria (Walker 1863)
 Hypomecis longipectinaria A. Blanchard & Knudson, 1984
 Hypomecis lunifera (Butler, 1879)
 Hypomecis luridula (Hulst, 1896)
 Hypomecis monotona (Inoue, 1978)
 Hypomecis nudicosta Inoue, 1983
 Hypomecis obliquisigna (Wileman, 1912)
 Hypomecis percnioides (Wehrli, 1943)
 Hypomecis punctinalis (Scopoli, 1763) – pale oak beauty
 Hypomecis roboraria (Denis & Schiffermüller, 1775) – great oak beauty
 Hypomecis separata (Walker 1863)
 Hypomecis transcissa (Walker, 1860)
 Hypomecis umbrosaria (Hübner, 1813)

References

Boarmiini
Geometridae genera